Neil Turner may refer to:
 Neil Turner (British politician) (born 1945), British Labour politician
 Neil Turner (Australian politician), former speaker of the Queensland Legislative Assembly
 Neil Turner (footballer) (born 1892), Scottish forward
 Neil Turner (rugby league), British winger

See also